Guillermo Héctor Francella (born February 14, 1955) is an Argentine actor and comedian. Besides a long history of working as a television leading man, he also has a varied theatrical and film career. Francella is widely regarded by experts and critics of performance as one of the most influential and popular actors of his country.

Biography
Guillermo Francella is the second of two brothers children of Ricardo Héctor Francella, a bank employee, gym teacher and weightlifting coach at Racing Club and Adelina Redondo. He spent his first two years of life in Villa del Parque, Buenos Aires, Argentina and later the family moved to Beccar, a northern neighborhood of Greater Buenos Aires where Francella lived the rest of his childhood. The house was located next to that of his paternal grandparents, Domenico and Zaída; his grandfather was an Italian immigrant in Argentina who had arrived in Argentina from Falconara Albanese, Calabria and whose original last name was Frangella. He attended and received a bachelor's degree from the Institute June 20 of San Isidro, Buenos Aires, Argentina in 1972. Later, although he wanted to study theater, he continued studying journalism. He got a journalist's degree after studying three years and later started working for the magazine Gente, where he served as a journalist for three months before being fired. He also worked as clothing seller in a store, as an insurance salesman and as a member of a real estate company with his uncle. His father died when Francella was twenty-six years old, which was "a very strong blow" to his family. Francella is a catholic.

Career
His first approach to acting was after finishing high school when he made a play with some classmates, the comedy Charlatanes by Julio F. Escobar. In the early 1980s he acted in a commercial for Cinzano. He debuted on television in 1980, with Los hnos. Torterolo and then was part of Historia de un trepador. In 1985 he filmed his first film, El telo y la tele, also participated as an extra in the film Los caballeros de la cama redonda starring Alberto Olmedo. He participated in other television series of the 1980s, such as El infiel, playing the role of Felipe for a year. In 1986, he filmed three films, Camarero nocturno en Mar del Plata and Las colegialas. He also acted in television series, such as El lobo and Juegos prohibidos. His career as a television and film actor continued during the following years with films such as Los pilotos más locos del mundo, Paraíso relax and Bañeros II, la playa loca, which had its third part in 2006. His first big hit on television was telecomedy De carne somos, broadcast by Canal 13 in 1988. After this strip he starred in Dalo por hecho, broadcast by Canal 13, playing an Argentine chanta (a scammer). Francella also made two TV series that were very popular at the time, La familia Benvenuto and Un hermano es un hermano, with Javier Portales.

In 1989 he starred in one of his greatest successes on film, the action comedy Los extermineitors, which worked mainly as a spoof on the action films of the 1980s. The following year, he filmed Extermineitors II, la venganza del dragón, the sequel and second part of the "Extermineitors saga" of comedy films; that same saga eventually became spawned into the 1992 action-comedy series Brigada Cola, an Extermineitors spinoff where Francella played the protagonist, Francachella. Brigada Cola was a big rating success that even became a short-lived theater version of the show with the same cast. During the early 1990s, Francella starred in two more sequels for Los extermineitors, with the saga coming to an end with the fourth part in the southern summer of 1992. When he returned to work on TV his fame had grown exponentially, even internationally, which is why his next series, Naranja y media was translated into English and broadcast in several countries under the title My Better Halves. His next movie, Un Argentino en New York, was filmed in Spain and United States; starring alongside the Uruguayan actress/singer Natalia Oreiro, it became one of the greatest Argentine cinema hits.

1999 came with a new challenge as an actor, the series Trillizos, dijo la partera with the actress Laura Novoa. On this occasion, he had to play three Buenos Aires brothers, Luigi, Marcelo and Enzo, that integrated a classic family of Italian roots, but in turn, each with a different personality that characterized them. In 2000 he filmed Papá es un ídolo it was translated in English with the name of Daddy is My Idol in this movie Manuel Bandera and Millie Stegman. He returned to television in 2001, in one of the most definitive roles of his career, in the comic program Poné a Francella, where he took part in several sketches next to his cast. He had two seasons and aired until December 2002. There he shared the cast with Gabriel Goity, Alberto Fernández de Rosa, Roberto Carnaghi, Florencia Peña, Andrea Frigerio, Mariana Briski, Manuel Wirtz, René Bertrand, Toti Ciliberto and Cecilia Milone and with newly emerged models such as Pamela David, Luciana Salazar and Julieta Prandi. The repetitions were broadcast until 2006 during the weekends in Argentina, while in other countries of Latin America and United States it was televised until the end of 2004. In 2003, he filmed in Cuba, Un día en el paraíso, movie in which Guillermo Francella played two characters, Reynaldo and Roy. That year he starred in the unit comedy, Durmiendo con mi jefe, with Luis Brandoni broadcast by Canal 13.

His next movie, Papá se volvió loco, was released in 2005 and became a hit in theaters. From 2005 to 2006 he starred in the series Casados con Hijos, an Argentine remake of Married... with Children, playing the role of José "Pepe" Argento. For that role, in the first season, Asociación de Periodistas de la Televisión y la Radiofonía Argentinas awarded the Martín Fierro Award to the "Best Leading Actor in Comedy", and in the second season, he was nominated again but lost to Facundo Arana. During these two years, he starred with Enrique Pinti at the Lola Membrives theater in Buenos Aires and then at the Auditorium Mar del Plata the musical comedy The Producers, a great success with both the public and critics. It was Francella's debut in the musical genre.

In 2007 he starred in a new comic film, Incorregibles, together with comedian Dady Brieva and model Gisela Van Lacke. The film was a box-office success, but received negative reviews by the critics. In 2008, he made a special participation in the final chapter of the soap opera Vidas robadas which won the Martín Fierro de Oro Award 2008. At the end of the year, he traveled to Mexico to star Rudo y Cursi along with the Mexican actors Gael García Bernal and Diego Luna. In 2009, he starred alongside Ricardo Darín and Soledad Villamil in El secreto de sus ojos which sold approximately two million tickets and became the most watched movie of the year, as well as the second most successful national film of all time in its country. The movie won an Oscar for the best non-English speaking film.

In 2011, he returned to the small screen with the TV comedy El hombre de tu vida, where he played the role of Hugo, a man affected by a midlife crisis who decides to work professionally as a gigolo. In addition, along with Arturo Puig, he starred in the Ana Katz comedy film Los Marziano. In 2012 saw the premiere of the comedy film ¡Atraco!, starring Francella alongside Nicolás Cabré and Amaia Salamanca under the direction of Eduard Cortés, playing a fictional Peronist named Merello. In addition, he had a small role in the film El vagoneta en el mundo del cine. In 2013, he starred in the Marcos Carnevale romantic film, Corazón de León, where he played León Godoy, a short-stature man who falls in love with Ivana Cornejo (Julieta Díaz) a divorced lawyer. For this interpretation he received his second nomination for Silver Condor Award, this time as Best Actor.

In 2014, he starred with Inés Estévez and Alejandro Awada in the comedy-drama El misterio de la felicidad, directed by Daniel Burman. Francella plays the role of a man looking for his missing friend while falling in love with his friend's wife. In addition, Francella returned to the theater and starring along Adrián Suar in Dos pícaros sinvergüenzas, where he plays Lawrence Williams, a man who scams women together with his partner. In 2015 he starred in The Clan, a crime thriller-historical film about the murders committed by the "Clan Puccio" in the early 1980s; Francella starred in the role of Arquimedes Puccio together with Peter Lanzani in the role of Alejandro Puccio, and directed by Pablo Trapero. The film was a box-office success and received an overall positive response by the critics.

Personal life
Since 1989 he is married to Marynés Breña, with whom he has two children, Nicolás Francella (born on October 22, 1990) and Johanna Francella (born on December 4, 1993).

Filmography

Film

Television

Theater

Awards and nominations

References

External links 
 
 

1955 births
Living people
Argentine male stage actors
Argentine male film actors
Argentine television personalities
Argentine people of Calabrian descent
Male actors from Buenos Aires
Argentine comedians